Ming Hwa Yuan (；Taiwanese Hokkien：bîng-huâ-hn̂g) is one of the most famous and organized Taiwanese opera troupes, which revives the Taiwanese traditional art by combining technologies and intricate performance skills. It was established by Chen Ming-Ji (陳明吉) in 1929. In 1997, after Mr. Chen's death, his third son, Chen Sheng-Fu (陳勝福), took over this traditional industry.

History

He started Ming Hwa troupe, the predecessor of Ming Hwa Yuan, with Tsai Bin-Hwa (蔡炳華), as proprietor of theater.

In the early stage, the Japanese rulers allowed the local customs to develop without much interference and Taiwanese opera continue to thrive. After the Pacific War broke out, the Japanese government implemented a Kōminka policy that encouraged Japanization. During this period (1937-1945), the Japanese government prohibited the public performance of Taiwanese opera. However, Ming Hwa troupe was one of the few groups that were allowed to perform. Taiwanese people were also strongly encouraged to speak the Japanese language, wear Japanese clothing, etc., which obstructed the development of Taiwanese opera.

In 1945, Taiwan was handed over to the Kuomintang-led Republic of China. Taiwanese opera was rejuvenated and became fashionable in Taiwan. In 1949, there were over 500 registered troupes. However, the American Westerns and Japanese Samurai movies blitzed the Taiwanese film market in the 1960s, which made the Taiwanese opera's box office flop.

After experiencing the rise and fall of Taiwanese opera, Ming Hwa Yuan has not only absorbed social trends, but has innovated the art by integrating the elements of modern theater and cinema. In 1982, they won the first prize of the National Theater Competition in Taiwan by the opera “Father and Son,” becoming an instant hit.

Organization

Ming Hwa Yuan is a family-owned troupe, managed by the family members. Under the general organization of Ming Hwa Yuan, there are eight sub groups, Tien, Di, Shuan, Hwang, Jer, Yue, Sin and Chan.

Feature

In spite of performing the traditional Taiwanese opera for almost a century, Ming Hwa Yuan is featured by the particularly contemporary stage design such as lightning and sound effects, which are similar to a large-scale live concert or contemporary theater performance. In other words, it emphasizes not only sound but also visual presentation, helping the audience understand the story.

Going through a series of reformation and innovation, Ming Hwa Yuan creates a unique and avant-garde performing style by mixing traditional heritage and modern technique. It has been praised as the “Broadway of the East” due to its distinctive presentation of Taiwanese opera, consisting by the folklore, poem-lyrics, theater, dancing, music, acrobatics, and fine art.

References cited

Further references

Lu, Yu Xiu. "Taiwanese Opera." In The Music History of Taiwan, 170-172. Taipei: Wu-Nan Culture Enterprise (五南文化廣場), 2003.
"Taiwanese Opera." Art Appreciation, Winter, 2012, December 15, 2012.

External links
Grand Immortal of Ponglai
Ming Hwa Yuan Arts & Culture Group
Taiwanese Opera

Taiwanese opera
Theatre companies in Taiwan